"This Is a Move" is a song by Tasha Cobbs Leonard, which was released as a standalone single on January 25, 2019. Cobbs Leonard co-wrote the song with Brandon Lake, Nate Moore, and Tony Brown. Kenneth Leonard Jr. handled the production of the single.

The song was a commercial success, debuting at number four on the Billboard's Hot Gospel Songs chart, spending twenty-six weeks on the chart. The song was number 33 on the year-end Hot Gospel Songs chart for 2019. "This Is a Move" won the GMA Dove Award Gospel Worship Recorded Song of the Year in the 2019 GMA Dove Awards. "This Is a Move" earned a Grammy Award nomination for Best Gospel Performance/Song in the 2020 Grammy Awards, and the Stellar Award for Song of the Year at the 2020 Stellar Awards.

Brandon Lake released the song as his debut single with Bethel Music on June 28, 2019. The song peaked on number 36 on the US Hot Christian Songs chart, spending eighteen weeks on the chart.

Background
Cobbs Leonard shared the story behind the song in an interview with Larissa Mendoza of Get Up! Mornings With Erica Campbell, saying:

Composition
Cobbs Leonard's vocal range spans from E♭3 to F5.

Music video
Tasha Cobbs Leonard released the live music video of "This Is a Move" through their YouTube channel on January 25, 2019.

Accolades

Charts

Weekly charts

Year-end charts

Release history

Brandon Lake version

On June 28, 2019, Brandon Lake released his own rendition of "This Is a Move" via Bethel Music as a standalone single. David Leonard produced Lake's single.

Artwork
Stephen James Hart, the art director and visual worship leader for Bethel Music, shared on his blog the story of the single artwork for Lake's rendition of the song. Hart worked with Suzzane Ecker and Lake on multiple covers before arriving at the final result, which captured "the tension between creativity and clarity."

Composition

Commercial performance
"This Is a Move" became Lake's first charting single, making its debut at number 41 on Billboard's Hot Christian Songs Chart dated July 13, 2019. The song peaked at number 36 on the September 28-dated chart, and spent a total of eighteen non-consecutive weeks on Hot Christian Songs Chart.

Music video
The live music video of the song, performed by Lake in a worship service at Bethel Church, was released on Apple Music on July 5, 2019.

Track listing

Charts

Release history

Other versions
 Bethel Music released an instrumental version of the song on their album, Without Words: Genesis, on November 15, 2019.
 On July 3, 2020, Housefires released their own rendition of "This Is a Move" which featured Nate Moore and Katie Torwalt on their album, Housefires + Friends (2020).

References

External links
  on PraiseCharts

2019 singles
2019 songs
Gospel songs
Contemporary Christian songs
Brandon Lake songs
Songs written by Brandon Lake